The International Staff Songsters (ISS) is the principal choir of the Salvation Army. Based in London, UK, the group performs Christian choral music in concerts, worship services and television and radio broadcasts, and has recorded more than 50 albums since its inauguration.

Members of the choir are Christians who are also members of their local Salvation Army church. The ISS regularly visits Salvation Army centres in the UK and has undertaken several international tours, including the US, Canada, France, Switzerland, Estonia, Australia, New Zealand, Kenya, South Africa, Argentina and Uruguay. Profits from recordings and performances are used to support the work of the Salvation Army. The ISS has performed in diverse locations; from notable venues across the UK, including the Royal Albert Hall, O2 Arena, Llandaff Cathedral, Gloucester Cathedral and Symphony Hall, to squatter camps, prisons and hostels. The ISS regularly performs on the long-running BBC Radio 4 shows The Daily Service and Sunday Worship, and has also featured on the BBC Television programme, Songs of Praise.

History and discography 
The ISS was originally established by an official minute issued by the Salvation Army's Chief of the Staff, Bramwell Booth, in March 1897. The group was composed of employees of the organisation's International Headquarters (IHQ) in London and the chief of the accounts department, Herbert Jackson, was appointed the first leader of the group. By 1912, it was reported that the ISS had travelled 25,000 miles and sung to audiences totalling more than 1,000,000 people. The ISS also attracted the attention of high-profile music critics, including George Bernard Shaw. In 1922, Jackson was succeeded by his deputy, Railton Howard, before the group was disbanded in 1928 due to "members' conflict of duties".

After a 52-year hiatus, the group was re-formed in March 1980 by General Arnold Brown who appointed Norman Bearcroft as the founding leader of the relaunched group, with membership no longer confined to headquarters employees. An inaugural concert took place at the Fairfield Halls, Croydon. The group has subsequently had a further four leaders and released a number of recordings, including some collaborations with notable brass bands, including the International Staff Band, Household Troops Band and Cory Band. Most of the group's recordings are produced and distributed by SP&S, although compilation albums featuring the music of the ISS have also been produced by Metro and Hallmark Records.

In 1988, the ISS performed much of the soundtrack of the Anglia Television series Marching as to War with Roy Castle. The ISS is a perennial performer at the Royal Albert Hall for Celebrating Christmas with the Salvation Army, which is broadcast annually on BBC Radio London and most other Local BBC Radio stations across the UK. In 2020, the 40th anniversary of the current ISS was marked by a concert with the London Mozart Players hosted by Welsh broadcaster Aled Jones and a special feature on BBC One's Songs of Praise in which JB Gill interviewed current members. In October 2021, the ISS took part in a special service on BBC Radio 4 to commemorate World Mental Health Day.

Associated groups 
Founded in 1891, the International Staff Band (ISB) is the premier brass band of the Salvation Army. Also based in London, the ISB regularly performs with the ISS at Salvation Army events in the UK.

Between 1960 and 1968, a Salvation Army female vocal group called the National Songsters operated in London.

The ISS has served as a model for the establishment of other 'Staff Songsters' which fulfil a similar function to the ISS and represent the Salvation Army in various countries, territories and cities around the world:

References

External links

The Salvation Army